Brown & Doherty Ltd v Whangarei County Council [1990] 2 NZLR 63 is a cited case in New Zealand regarding quantum meruit.

References

New Zealand contract case law
High Court of New Zealand cases
1990 in New Zealand law
1990 in case law